The Empire and Dublin Railroad was founded in 1888 in Georgia, United States. The railroad ran into financial trouble and was reorganized as the Oconee and Western Railroad in 1892.

Defunct Georgia (U.S. state) railroads
Predecessors of the Central of Georgia Railway
Railway companies established in 1888
Railway companies disestablished in 1892